Banker is a surname. Notable people with the surname include:

 Ashok Banker (born 1964), Indian author and screenwriter
 Bill Banker (1907–1985), American college football player
 Grace Banker (1892–1960, director of the World War I Signal Corps Female Telephone Operators Unit, Distinguished Service Medal recipient
 Howard James Banker (1866–1940), American mycologist
 Mark Banker, American football coach